Edward and Friends is a children's TV series in claymation from FilmFair that aired on British, New Zealand and Canadian television in 1987–1989. Each episode was 5-minutes in length and was based on LEGO's successful 1980s Fabuland theme. 28 episodes were produced.

Edward Elephant was the main character in the show and the episodes were centred on him and his many friends including Bonnie Bunny and Max Mouse.

It was Lego's first foray into animation and television in general.

Bernard Cribbins provided the voice-over for the show. Written by Michael Cole with music by Mike Batt.

List of Edward and Friends characters

Video releases 
Two VHS videocassettes of Edward and Friends were published by Screen Legends/Pickwick Video, which together comprised eighteen episodes. Between the episodes on VHS and back-to-back TV episodes, short segments were placed featuring Edward Elephant performing different tricks and one or two of his friends pushing apart the black screen.

A significant number of episodes were not released on VHS, including "Christmas in Fabuland", "Edward and the Big Balloon", "Catherine's Cake", "The Great Race", "The Snowfall", "The Clock Tower", "Clive is Taller", "Edward and the Statue", "The Expedition", and the Earth Day special "A Trust to Nature".

Episodes

Books 
In addition, there were also a series of seven books published by Ladybird Books Inc. The books have the same title as the TV series episodes and used still photos from the TV show. Each book contains 2 stories except Christmas in Fabuland, which, however, contains storylines from two episodes.
The list of books available were:
Lionel's Party/Edward and the Camera ,
Edward gets the Hiccups/Wilfred's Treasure ,
Edward joins the band/Clive's Kite ,
Lionel's Car/Edward to the rescue ,
Edward tries to help/Boris gets a scooter ,
Edward and the big balloon/A robot for Max ,
Christmas in Fabuland .

Credits 
Voices: Bernard Cribbins, Royce Mills, Bill Pertwee, Sheila Steafel
Written by: Michael Cole
Music by: Mike Batt
Technical Design: Gordon Tait
Models: Heather Boucher, Pauline London, Dave Witts
Edited by: Rob Dunbar
Executive Producer: Graham Clutterbuck
Produced by: Barrie Edwards
Animated & Directed by: Jo Pullen, Martin Pullen, Jeff Newitt

References

External links
 
 Edward and Friends at Toonhound

1987 British television series debuts
1987 British television series endings
1980s British children's television series
Animated television series about elephants
British children's animated television shows
English-language television shows
British stop-motion animated television series
Television series by FilmFair
Television series by DHX Media
1980s British animated television series
TVNZ 1 original programming
Lego television series